László Marton (6 January 1943 – 12 September 2019) was a Hungarian contemporary theatre director. Marton was the artistic director of the Vígszínház and professor of the University of Theatre, Film and Television in Budapest. Marton was known for directing classics through a new lens and his productions have been seen in more than 40 cities throughout the world.

He was Honorary Member of the London Guildhall School of Music and Drama. Marton earned three Dora Mavor Moore Awards for his Chekhov productions in Toronto, for Masterclass Theatre and for Soulpepper Theatre Company, and the Irish Times Theatre Award as Best Director for The Wild Duck, a production he directed for the Abbey Theatre (National Theatre of Ireland) in Dublin.

In October 2017, several victims accused Marton of sexual harassment and assault. He initially denied the allegations, but later issued an apology. His employment at Vígszínház was subsequently terminated.

Early life and education

Marton was born in Budapest, Hungary, to Ilona Keresztes, a graduate of École hôtelière de Lausanne, and László Marton, Sr., a representative for a Hungarian foreign trade company. He is also related to Golden Globe Award winner Hollywood movie director Andrew Marton. Marton's interest in theatre took root early in his life, and he was first introduced to the world of opera by his godfather, Hungarian conductor, János Ferencsik. Marton attended the Secondary School of the Piarist Fathers and graduated from the University of Theatre, Film and Television in Budapest in 1967. In the same year, at the age of twenty-four he staged his first professional play at the Vígszínház, in Budapest, where he became artistic director in 1987.

Career

Marton's international career started in 1974 in Germany at the Deutsches Nationaltheater and Staatskapelle Weimar. Since then he directed for the Finnish National Theatre, Actors Theatre of Louisville, the Habima Theatre (Israel's National Theatre), the Barbican Centre in London, Santa Fe Stages in New Mexico, the Court Theatre in Chicago, the Abbey Theatre in Dublin, Soulpepper Theatre Company in Toronto and others.

Some of his most important theatrical works included a new adaptation of Chekhov's Platonov, (by Marton and Susan Coyne) for Soulpepper Theatre Company in Toronto, and productions of Chekhov's Uncle Vanya for Soulpepper Theatre Company in Toronto and Playmakers Repertory Company in Chapel Hill, North Carolina, with set and costume designer Michael Levine. In celebration of their 10th anniversary in 2008, (Celebrating 10 Years of history's greatest plays 1998–2008) Soulpepper Theatre Company revived Marton's Production of Uncle Vanya.

In 2003 Marton directed a new adaptation of Ibsen's The Wild Duck by Frank McGuinness for The Peacock Theatre in Dublin and later for Soulpepper Theatre Company in Toronto. His production of Dance in Time for the Vígszínház was invited to the Abbey Theatre's centenary programme in 2004. A year later he directed a production of A Doll's House by Henrik Ibsen for the Abbey Theatre in Dublin, in a new version by McGuinness.

As of September 2009, Marton was directing Mozart's The Magic Flute for the Vígszínház, in collaboration with the Hungarian State Opera House.

Marton's productions of great emotional resonance were highly acclaimed by critics for revealing a deep psychological intimacy and bringing new life to classics. An actress said that working with him is "incredibly demanding but he's incredibly kind as well. It just creates an atmosphere where it feels safe to risk things".

Sexual assault allegations 
On 14 October 2017, Hungarian actress Lilla Sárosdi alleged in a Facebook post that a well-known Hungarian theatre director had sexually assaulted her 20 years earlier. A few days later she named Marton as the perpetrator. At first Marton denied the allegations, but suspended his teaching activity and resigned from his position at Vígszínház. On 20 October, two more people anonymously accused Marton of sexual assault. Two days later, 444.hu published an article with similar stories from several new victims. Marton declined to comment on the new allegations. One week after the original allegations, Marton issued a statement "'apologizing for hurting anybody or putting them in a difficult situation", adding that "he never intended to hurt or humiliate anyone". Lilla Sárosdi said she accepted the apology. On the same day two new victims accused Marton of sexual assault. Subsequently, Vígszínház initiated the termination of Marton's employment.

Toronto's Soulpepper Theatre Company revealed it severed ties with Marton back in 2015 after a member of its community filed a complaint about sexual harassment. Marton's relationship with the company was immediately and permanently terminated. Soulpepper said "Marton's behaviour was both unacceptable in human terms and in violation of Soulpepper’s past and present policies and codes of conduct."

Productions

The Art of Comedy – The Silk Hat (1967) – Vígszínház, Budapest
The Kiss (1968) – Pesti Theatre, Budapest
Can you speak Spanish? (1968) – Vígszínház, Budapest
Love, Closed in the Cupboard (1969) – Pesti Theatre, Budapest
For How Long Can One Be an Angel? (1969) – Pesti Theatre, Budapest
Theatre (1969) – Vígszínház, Budapest
Cinderella (1969) – Bartók Children’s Theatre, Budapest
Napoleon and Napoleon (1970) – Vígszínház, Budapest
Plaza Suite (1970) – Vígszínház, Budapest
Summer and Smoke (1971) – Vígszínház, Budapest
What Did You Lose, Miss? (1971) – Operetta Theatre, Budapest
A Flea in her Ear (1971) – Vígszínház, Budapest
Bye-bye, Darling (1972) – Pesti Theatre, Budapest
Bella (1972) – Vígszínház, Budapest
Squaring the Circle (1972) – Pesti Theatre, Budapest
An Imaginary Report on an American Pop Festival (1973) – Vígszínház, Budapest
The School for Wives (1973) – Vígszínház, Budapest
The Dreams of Reason (1974) – Vígszínház, Budapest
An Imaginary Report on an American Pop Festival (1974) – Nationaltheater, Weimar
I am Thirty (1975) – Vígszínház, Budapest
Further Sufferings of W. Junior (1975) – Pesti Theatre, Budapest
The Mistress of the Inn (1976) – Vígszínház, Budapest
Royal Hunt (1976) – Pesti Theatre, Budapest
The School for Wives (1976) – National Theatre, Helsinki
Good Evening Summer, Good Evening Love! (1977) – Vígszínház, Budapest
Before Sunset (1977) – National Theatre, Helsinki
Cubic Space (1978) – Pesti Theatre, Budapest
Measure for Measure (1979) – National Theatre, Helsinki
The Prince of Homburg (1980) – Vígszínház, Budapest
The Royal Comedians (1980) – Vígszínház, Budapest
The Hunt (1981) – Vígszínház Studio, Budapest
The Guardsman (1981) – Landestheater Detmold
The Tower (1982) – Pesti Theatre, Budapest
King Béla the Blind (1982) – Castle Theatre, Gyula
King Béla the Blind (1982) – Pesti Theatre, Budapest
The Dupe (1982) – Vígszínház, Budapest
Physicists (1982) – Landestheater, Detmold
A Midsummer Night’s Dream (1983) – Pesti Theatre, Budapest
A Midsummer Night’s Dream (1983) – Actors Theatre of Louisville
Richard II (1984) – Vígszínház, Budapest
The Invisible Legion (1985) – Vígszínház, Budapest
The School for Wives (1985) – Actors Theatre of Louisville
Liliomfi (1985) – Lyceum Court, Eger
Ivan the Terrible (1986) – Vígszínház, Budapest
Star of Seville (1986) – Vígszínház, Budapest
The Royal Comedians (1986) – Actors Theatre of Louisville
The Mistress of the Inn (1986) – Masterclass, Toronto
Push-Up (1987) – Pesti Theatre, Budapest
Little Shop of Horrors (1987) – Actors Theatre of Louisville
The School for Wives (1987) – Habima, Tel Aviv
The Attic (1988) – Vígszínház, Budapest
The Proconsul of Caligula (1988) – Pesti Theatre, Budapest
As We Do It (1989) – Vígszínház, Budapest
Les liaisons dangereuses (1989) – Actors Theatre of Louisville
The Horse (1989) – Barbican, London
Black Peter (1990) – Vígszínház, Budapest
Richard III (1990) – Vígszínház, Budapest
Three Sisters (1991) – Masterclass, Toronto
Les liaisons dangereuses (1991) – Masterclass, Toronto
The Tower (1991) – Habima, Tel Aviv
The Mistress of the Inn (1991) – Bersheva, Tel Aviv
Servant to Two Masters (1992) – Vígszínház, Budapest
Death of a Salesman (1992) – Habima, Tel Aviv
Shooting Simone (1993) – Actors Theatre of Louisville – Humana Festival
Incident at Vichy (1994) – Pesti Theatre, Budapest
Dance in Time (1994) – Vígszínház, Budapest
Macbeth (1995) – Vígszínház, Budapest
Beast on the Moon (1995) – Actors Theatre of Louisville – Humana Festival
Olympia (1995) – Actors Theatre of Louisville
Masterclass (1996) – Pesti Theatre, Budapest
The Plays the Thing (1996) – Court Theatre, Chicago
The School for Wives (1996) – Santa Fe Stages
Sylvia (1997) – Vígszínház, Budapest
Lighting Up the Two Year Old (1997) – Actors Theatre of Louisville – Humana Festival
The Guardsman (1997) – Santa Fe Stages
14 Szent István Boulevard (1998) – Vígszínház, Budapest
Popcorn (1998) – Vígszínház, Budapest
Dance in Time (1998) – Clarence Brown Theatre, Knoxville
The School for Wives (1998) – Court Theatre, Chicago
A Midsummer Night’s Dream (1999) – Court Theatre Chicago
The Play’s the Thing (1999) – Soulpepper Theatre Company, Toronto
Platonov (1999) – Soulpepper Theatre Company, Toronto
The Play’s the Thing(1999) – Ottawa Art Center
A Woman (2000) – Vígszínház Studio, Budapest
The Odd Couple (2000) – Vígszínház, Budapest
Platonov (2000) – Soulpepper Theatre Company, Toronto
Uncle Vanya (2001) – Soulpepper Theatre Company, Toronto
A Doll's House (2001) – Vígszínház, Budapest
A Flea in her Ear (2001) – Soulpepper Theatre Company, Toronto
Black-out (2002) – Pesti Theatre, Budapest
Legend of a Horse (2002) – Vígszínház, Budapest
Uncle Vanya (2002) – Soulpepper Theatre Company, Toronto
Uncle Vanya (2003) – Playmakers Repertory Company, Chapel Hill
The Wild Duck (2003) – The Peacock Theatre, Dublin
The Play's the Thing (2003) – Soulpepper Theatre Company, Toronto
A Doll's House (2003) – The Rep, Milwaukee
Pisti in the Bloodshed (2004) – Vígszínház, Budapest
The Mistress of the Inn (2004) – Soulpepper Theatre Company, Toronto
The Guardsman (2005) – Alliance Theatre, Atlanta
A Doll's House (2005) – The Abbey Theatre, Dublin
The Wild Duck (2005) – Soulpepper Theatre Company, Toronto
A Flea in her Ear (2005) – The Rep, Milwaukee
Three Sisters (2007) – Soulpepper Theatre Company, Toronto
Uncle Vanya (2008) – Soulpepper Theatre Company, Toronto
The Mistress of the Inn (2009) – The Rep, Milwaukee
The Guardsman (2009) – Soulpepper Theatre Company, Toronto
Uncle Vanya (2010) – Vígszínház, Budapest
To Be or Not To Be (2011) – Vígszínház, Budapest
The Black Out (2013) –  Rózsavölgyi Szalon, Budapest
Tartuffe (2014) – Soulpepper Theatre Company, Toronto

Awards and titles

Order of Merit of the Republic of Hungary – Commander's Cross with the Star (2009)
Irish Times Theatre Award – Best Director (The Wild Duck by Henrik Ibsen) Ireland (2004)
International Associate Director – Abbey Theatre Dublin (2003–2004)
Kossuth Prize – Hungary (2003)
The Most Inspiring Civil Leader Award (2002)
Dora Mavor Moore Award – Best Production (Platonov by Chekhov) Canada (2001)
Dora Mavor Moore Award – Best Director (Platonov by Chekhov) Canada (2000)
Doctor of Liberal Arts (1999)
Zsolt Harsányi Memorial Award (1998)
Member of Stage Directors and Choreographers Society USA (1997)
Order of Merit of the Hungarian Republic – Commander's Cross (1994)
Pro Budapest Award (1994)
Podmaniczky Award (1994)
Imre Roboz Memorial Award (1994)
Full-resident Professor of the Hungarian Academy of Dramatic Art (1992)
Dora Mavor Moore Award – Best Production (Three Sisters by Chekhov) Canada (1991)
Honorary Member of the London Guildhall School of Music and Drama (Great-Britain) (1990)
The Award of the Hungarian Architects' Society (1985)
Pro Children Award (1985)
Artist of Merit of the Hungarian People's Republic (1984)
Pro Castle Theatre Award (1982)
Special Award of City of Veszprém – Veszprém TV Festival (1982)
Plovdiv International TV Award (1982)
Mari Jászai Award (1975)

References

External links
 Official Web site
 Soulpepper Theatre
 Vígszínház
 Ivett Körösi: #MeToo: László Marton denounced

1943 births
2019 deaths
Dora Mavor Moore Award winners
Hungarian theatre directors
Commander's Crosses with Star of the Order of Merit of the Republic of Hungary (civil)
Artists of Merit of the Hungarian People's Republic